Agartala Government Medical College (AGMC) is a government medical college located on the lap of Agartala, the capital city of Tripura. It is at Kunjaban near the Malancha Niwas, home of the Manikya Dynasty in Agartala. The college is attached with the Govind Ballabh Pant Hospital (G.B. Pant hospital), which is the hospital of the college. It is completely run by the Government of Tripura.

History
The college was established in 2005 and the foundation stone was laid by the Prime Minister of India, Dr. Manmohan Singh. The college is recognised by the Medical Council of India (MCI) and is affiliated to Tripura University.

Campus

The Medical College campus is spread over 42 acres of land. It includes :
 Administrative Building with 5 Lecture Halls
A 300 capacity UG Boys’ Hostel.
 200 capacity UG Girls’ Hostel.
 40 capacity Girls’ Intern.
 60 capacity Boys Intern.
 350 capacity Nurses Hostel.
 200 capacity Resident Doctor Hostel.
PG Hostel
 132 units of staff quarters for Associate Professor / Assistant Professor / Tutor / Sr. Residents. 96 Units of Staff quarters for Jr. Resident / Technical Assistant etc. and 12 units of Staff quarter for Professor.
 A 660 sitting capacity Auditorium named after Karl Landsteiner who is the founder of ABO blood grouping. 
 A Gymnasium equipped with modern Instruments.
The AGMC annual festival "Phoenix" a 7-day mega event is one of the biggest college fests of the state.
 Play Ground and a Branch of a Bank with ATM facility.

Departments

 Anatomy
 Physiology
 Biochemistry
 Pathology
 Pharmacology
 Microbiology
 Forensic Medicine and Toxicology
 Community Medicine
 Ophthalmology
 ENT
 Medicine
 Surgery
 Obstetrics & Gynaecology
 Pediatrics
 Psychiatry
 Anaesthesiology
 Radiodiagnosis
 Tuberculosis & Respiratory Diseases (Chest Medicine)
 Dentistry
 Dermatology, STD & Leprosy
 Casualty
 Trauma
 Neurosurgery
 Urology
 Plastic Surgery
 Nephrology

Academics

Seat distribution
The annual intake of students for the course of MBBS is 125, divided as follows:
 96 students from the state of Tripura who qualify through the State Quota of  National Eligibility and Entrance Test (NEET).This 96 seats in further divided as follow:
UR-40 (including 1 WESM)
SC-16
ST-30 (including 1 WESM)
EWS-10

5% seat reservation for PWD students (As per guideline and eligibility)
 19 students from the Central Pool who qualify through the 15% All India Quota (AIQ) of National Eligibility and Entrance Test (NEET). This seat is further divided as below:
UR-11(including 1 PH)
SC-3( including 1 PH)
ST-1

 10 students from the rest of North East. As a gesture of good will the Government of Tripura has offered ten seats from its quota to four North-Eastern States viz. Mizoram (two seats), Nagaland (three seats), Meghalaya (three seats) and Arunachal Pradesh (two seats) as there is no medical college in those states.

Admission
A candidate who has completed the age of 17 years on or before 31 December of the corresponding year is eligible for admission. Date of birth as recorded in the Madhyamik / 10th Standard / School Leaving Certificate issued by the concerned Board of Education will be taken as authentic.

Candidates must have passed the Higher Secondary Examination or the Indian School Certificate Examination which is equivalent to 10+2 Higher Secondary Examination after a period of 12 years of study with at least 45% marks, the last two years of study consisting of Physics, Chemistry and Biology or any other elective subjects with English at a level not less than core course of English as prescribed by the National Council of Educational Research and Training after the introduction of the 10+2+3 years educational structure as recommended by the National Committee on education. All or any such examination must be recognized by the Tripura University for the purpose of admission.

All candidates (Tripura State quota = 75 seats+all India quota = 5 + North East quota = 10) should appear in the NEET, conducted by CBSE for admission to this Medical College.

Admission in state quota will be as per the state merit list of NEET Prepared by Medical Counseling Committee constituted by the Govt. of Tripura.

Admission in all India quota (15) will be through all India common merit list of NEET.

Admission in North East quota will be through NEET Merit list of respective state and will be conducted by Medical Counselling committee of that state.
 
All admissions are subject to verification of the original certificates / documents produced by the candidates. Regarding the eligibility of any applicant, the decision of the Medical Counselling Committee, Govt. of Tripura and the Director of Medical Education as per the MCI guideline shall be final.

All admissions are subject to Medical Fitness of the candidate.

Academic Calendar

Grouping of subjects for examination
 

PG seats in AGMC:

Total - 79 in numbers from 2020 post graduate admission.

References

External links

 Official website of Agartala Government Medical College 

Medical colleges in Tripura
Education in Agartala
Educational institutions established in 2005
2005 establishments in Tripura